Howchin North Stream is a meltwater stream draining from the north side of Howchin Glacier in the Denton Hills, Scott Coast, Antarctica. It flows eastward into Howchin Lake northward of Howchin South Stream. The stream was named by the New Zealand Geographic Board in 1994 in association with Howchin Glacier.

References

Rivers of Victoria Land
Scott Coast